"White Flag" is a song by English singer-songwriter Dido, released as the lead single from her second studio album, Life for Rent. The song was first released to US radio on 7 July 2003 and was issued in the United Kingdom as a physical single on 1 September 2003. The song performed well on record charts around the world, peaking at number one in Australia, Austria, the Czech Republic, Germany, Italy, Norway, and Portugal. In Dido's native UK, it reached number two on the UK Singles Chart, and in the United States, it climbed to number 18 on the Billboard Hot 100.

The song's music video, directed by Joseph Kahn, features actor David Boreanaz as Dido's love interest. "White Flag" was nominated for the Best Female Pop Vocal Performance at the 46th Grammy Awards but lost to Christina Aguilera's "Beautiful". It won the Best British Single at the 2004 Brit Awards. "White Flag" ranked at number 317 on Blender's list "The 500 Greatest Songs Since You Were Born".

Background and composition
"White Flag" was written and produced by Dido, Rick Nowels, and Rollo Armstrong. In the song, the protagonist is unwilling to give up, even if she knows her relationship is over.

"White Flag" features "multi-layered" sound, delicate piano outro, and strings. The majority of the song is in the key of D minor, but constantly alternates between that key and its relative major, F major. The tempo is 90 beats per minute, and Dido's vocals range from the low note of A3 to the high note of C5.

Critical reception
David Jeffries from AllMusic praised "Dido's sweet delivery" and stated that "It’s all very beautiful, the perfect soundtrack for weeping, and the definition of "wistful" in a song." Derryck Strachan wrote for BBC Music that the song is "engaging to the extent that you could easily be humming along without it registering in your brain. There's something unconscious, pleasantly innocuous about it. It's comfort food for the ears and it could be easily on a Tom Hanks–Meg Ryan romantic comedy." Alexis Petridis from The Guardian wrote that the song "is a superb, confidently written pop song, possessed of a chorus that is impossible to dislodge from your memory without the aid of hypnotherapy."

Awards and success
The song was nominated for Best Female Pop Vocal Performance at the 2004 Grammy Awards, but lost to Christina Aguilera's "Beautiful". The song won the award for "Best Single" at the 2004 BRIT Awards.

Music video
The music video, directed by Joseph Kahn, was filmed in Cape Town, South Africa and features actor David Boreanaz as Dido's love interest.

The video tells a story about a relationship that is over, but where Dido is obviously still smitten with her ex, who is oblivious of her. They have numerous occasions where they are near each other without him noticing. Dido is clearly still not over him, and he is clearly not over her. At the end of the video, they return to their apartments and Dido's room is filled with photos of him and, in a twist ending, his apartment is also filled with Dido's photos (showing he's still as much in love with her as well.) The screen rotates throughout the entirety of the video, never standing still. The song's opening is also cut out entirely from the video.

Track listings

European and Japanese CD single
 "White Flag" – 3:58
 "Paris" – 3:23

European 12-inch single
A. "White Flag" (Beginnerz Remix) – 7:33
B. "White Flag" (Version Idjut) – 7:12

US promo CD
 "White Flag" (radio edit) – 3:36

US 7-inch single
A. "White Flag" – 4:00
B. "Don't Leave Home" – 3:46

Australian CD single
 "White Flag"
 "Paris"
 "White Flag" (Johnny Toobad mix)

Credits and personnel
Credits are lifted from the European CD single liner notes.

Studios
 Recorded and mixed at The Church (London, England)
 Additional recording at The Ark (Lincolnshire, England)
 Strings recorded at Angel Recording Studios  (London, England)
 Mastered at Metropolis Studios  (London, England)

Personnel

 Dido – writing (as Dido Armstrong), vocals, production
 Rick Nowels – writing, guitar, keyboards
 Rollo – writing (as Rollo Armstrong), production
 Paul Herman – additional acoustic guitar
 Rusty Anderson – electric guitar
 Mark Bates – additional keyboards, piano, programming
 P*Nut – drums and bass programming
 Ash Howes – recording, mixing
 Grippa – additional recording
 Gavin Callaghan – recording assistant
 Nathan Loughran – recording assistant
 Nick Ingman – string arrangement
 Gavyn Wright – concertmaster
 Miles Showell – mastering
 Simon Corkin – artwork design
 Ellen Von Unwerth – photography

Charts

Weekly charts

Year-end charts

Certifications

Release history

References

2003 singles
2003 songs
Arista Records singles
BMG Japan singles
Brit Award for British Single
Cheeky Records singles
Dido (singer) songs
European Hot 100 Singles number-one singles
Music videos directed by Joseph Kahn
Number-one singles in Australia
Number-one singles in Austria
Number-one singles in the Czech Republic
Number-one singles in Germany
Number-one singles in Hungary
Number-one singles in Italy
Number-one singles in Norway
Number-one singles in Portugal
Song recordings produced by Dido (singer)
Song recordings produced by Rollo Armstrong
Songs written by Dido (singer)
Songs written by Rick Nowels
Songs written by Rollo Armstrong